Pip is a 1907 novel by the British writer Ian Hay. His debut work, its title hero is a schoolboy.

References

Bibliography

 George Watson & Ian R. Willison. The New Cambridge Bibliography of English Literature, Volume 4. CUP, 1972.
 Richard Usborne. Wodehouse at work to the end. Barrie and Jenkins, 1976.

1907 British novels
Novels by Ian Hay
1907 debut novels